Dřevíkov is a settlement in Chrudim District in the Czech Republic. It was probably founded in 1542 and since 1961 it has been a part of the Vysočina municipality.

Jewish community
The first Jewish settlers came to Dřevíkov in the early 18th century. Between 1837 and 1849 there was at least 25 Jewish families in the village (roughly half of Dřevíkov´s total population). As the Jewish people gained all civil rights, they started leaving Dřevíkov. The last Jewish family left Dřevíkov in 1910.

Jewish sites

In the second half of the 18th century the community built itself a "Jewish street". A few houses stand there still (notably the school or synagogue).

Synagogue
The synagogue was situated on the eastern end of the Jewish street (No. 43). The first mentions are from 1790 and services took place here till the end of the 19th century. Afterwards it was rebuilt and nowadays it serves as a residential house.

Jewish cemetery
A Jewish cemetery is situated in a forest approximately 500 m northwest from the village. It contains valuable baroque and classicist maceivas. It was founded in the middle of the 18th century. The oldest preserved grave stone is from 1762. In 1876 it was extended and it remained in use until the 1930s. The cemetery is now in the possession of the Prague kehilah.

References

External links
Official website of the municipality
Informace o židovském osídlení na serveru Holocaust.cz

Neighbourhoods in the Czech Republic
Villages in Chrudim District